Vitas might refer to:

 VITAS Healthcare, the largest provider of hospice care in the U.S.
 Vitas (born 1979), Russian singer
 Vitas (Bishop of Lithuania) (died ca. 1269), Dominican priest and bishop
 Vitas Gerulaitis (1954–1994), Lithuanian-American professional tennis player
 Short for Vytautas, Lithuanian given name

See also
 Vita (disambiguation)